Lycaena nivalis, the lilac-bordered copper or nivalis copper, is a butterfly of the family Lycaenidae. It is found in the western mountains of North America.

The wingspan is 25–29 mm. Adults are on wing from July to mid-August.

The larvae feed on Polygonum douglasii.

Subspecies
 Lycaena nivalis nivalis
 Lycaena nivalis browni dos Passos, 1938

References

Lycaena
Butterflies described in 1869